Vladislav Yevgenyevich Korobkin (born 21 June 2000) is a Russian former football player.

Club career
He made his debut in the Russian Football National League for FC Fakel Voronezh on 20 July 2019 in a game against FC Chertanovo Moscow.

References

External links
 Profile by Russian Football National League
 

2000 births
Living people
Russian footballers
Association football midfielders
FC Fakel Voronezh players